Jenkins's shrew (Crocidura jenkinsi) is a critically endangered species of mammal in the family Soricidae. It is endemic to South Andaman Island in India.

References 

 Chakraborty, S., Pradhan, M.S. & Subramanian, K.A. 2002.

Jenkins's shrew
Mammals of India
Endemic fauna of the Andaman Islands
Jenkins's shrew
Taxonomy articles created by Polbot